The La Colonia Formation is a geological formation in Argentina whose strata date back to the Late Cretaceous. Dinosaur remains are among the fossils that have been recovered from the formation.

Originally thought to be Campanian (c.73-72 million years ago) in age or earlier, studies of underlying formations have made a Maastrichtian (70–66 million years ago) age more likely.

Flora 
The paleoflora was known for its aquatic components, Paleoazolla and Regnellidium. However, recent paleobotanical discoveries at the Cañadón del Irupé locality have revealed the presence of a more diverse range of plants associated with these water bodies, including pteridophytes, gymnosperms, and various angiosperms. Among these are fossil leaves and fruits assignable to Nelumbonaceae.

Fossil content

Turtles

Plesiosaurs

Mammals 
Over 300 mammal specimens have been found in the La Colonia Formation.

Dinosaurs

See also 
 List of dinosaur-bearing rock formations
 Allen Formation, Campanian to Maastrichtian fossiliferous formation of the Neuquén Basin
 Angostura Colorada Formation, Campanian to Maastrichtian fossiliferous formation of the North Patagonian Massif
 Colorado Formation, Campanian to Maastrichtian fossiliferous formation of the Colorado Basin
 Lago Colhué Huapí Formation, Campanian to Maastrichtian fossiliferous formation of the Golfo San Jorge Basin

References

Bibliography

Further reading 
 A. M. Albino. 2000. New record of snakes from the Cretaceous of Patagonia (Argentina). Geodiversitas 22(2):247-253
 N. R. Cúneo, E. J. Hermsen, and M. A. Gandolfo. 2013. Regnellidium (Salviniales, Marsileaceae) macrofossils and associated spores from the Late Cretaceous of South America. PloSOne 174(3):340-349
 J. P. O'Gorman, L. Salgado, I. A. Cerda and Z. Gasparini. 2013. First record of gastroliths associated with elasmosaur remains from La Colonia Formation (Campanian–Maastrichtian), Chubut, Patagonia Argentina, with comments on the probable depositional palaeoenvironment of the source of the gastroliths. Cretaceous Research 40:212-217
 J. O'Gorman and Z. Gasparini. 2013. Revision of Sulcusuchus erraini (Sauropterygia, Polycotylidae) from the Upper Cretaceous of Patagonia, Argentina. Alcheringa 37(2):163-176
 T. Harper, A. Parras, and G. W. Rougier. 2018. Reigitherium (Meridiolestida, Mesungulatoidea) an Enigmatic Late Cretaceous Mammal from Patagonia, Argentina: Morphology, Affinities, and Dental Evolution. Journal of Mammalian Evolution
 Z. Kielan-Jaworowska, E. Ortiz-Jaureguizar, C. Vieytes, R. Pascual, and F. J. Goin. 2007. First cimolodontan multituberculate mammal from South America. Acta Palaeontologica Polonica 52(2):257-262

Geologic formations of Argentina
Upper Cretaceous Series of South America
Cretaceous Argentina
Maastrichtian Stage of South America
Sandstone formations
Shale formations
Siltstone formations
Conglomerate formations
Tidal deposits
Formations
Fossiliferous stratigraphic units of South America
Paleontology in Argentina
Geology of Chubut Province
Geology of Patagonia